The 1938 Idaho Southern Branch Bengals football team was an American football team that represented the University of Idaho, Southern Branch (later renamed Idaho State University) as an independent during the 1938 college football season. In their fourth season under head coach Guy Wicks, the team compiled a 4–3 record and outscored opponents by a total of 131 to 40.

Schedule

Notes

References

External links
 1939 Wickiup football section — yearbook summary of the 1938 season

Idaho Southern Branch
Idaho State Bengals football seasons
Idaho Southern Branch Bengals football